L'antimiracolo is a 1965 Italian documentary film directed by .

External links
 

1965 films
1960s Italian-language films
Italian documentary films
1965 documentary films
1960s Italian films